Zağnos SK is the women's handball team of the same named club in Trabzon, Turkey. The team plays in the Turkish Super League. Club colors are red, blue and white.

Competitions
The women's handball branch was founded when the club Trabzon Hentbol Akademi SK, which played in the Turkish Women's Handball First League, purchased and renamed Zağnos SK. The team finished the 2013–14 season as runner-up, failed to advance to the Super League after ranking the third place in the play-offs. However, they were promoted as placeholder for a team, which missed to apply on time. Thus, they played in the 2014–15 season for the first time in the Turkey Women's Super League. The team won the play-outs ranking first in the group, and qualified to remain in the league.

European record

Current squad
Squad for the 2017-18 season

Goalkeepers
 12  Serpil Abdioğlu
 61  Serpil Capar

Wingers
LW
 08  Jovana Bartosić-Atanasković
RW
 11  Tatiana Kyriushyna
 35  Yagmur Toprak
Line players 
 07  Martina Pavić
 10  Itana Čavlović
 22  Gökce Afsar

Backs
LB
 13  Duygu Sakalli
 19  Buçe Tacyildiz
 21  Betül Yılmaz
CB
 01  Sevginur Bektas
 17  Tanja Vučković
 29  Sanja Vlaskalić
RB
 23  Lidija Horvat

References

Handball
Turkish handball clubs
Women's handball in Turkey